, literally "the hall for the study of the way of karate," is a Japanese school of karate developed by Kanken Toyama (1888 – 1966).
It was the total headquarters of Japan Karate Federation (old).
Characteristics of Shudokan karate include large circular motions with an emphasis on covering and its own unique kata.

History

Toyama's karate training began at the age of nine in 1897 with Itarashiki, although he studied with Yatsusune Itosu for 18 years, until the latter's death in 1915. In 1907 Toyama was appointed "shihandai" (assistant master) to Itosu at the Okinawa Teacher's College, and he and Gichin Funakoshi, who later developed Shotokan karate, were the only two students to be granted the title of shihanshi (protégé).

In 1924 Toyama moved his family to Taiwan, where he taught in an elementary school and studied Chinese Ch'uan Fa, which included Taku, Makaitan, Rutaobai, and Ubo from teachers Chen Fo-Chai (陳佛濟) and Lin Hsien-Tang (林献堂). 

In early 1930 he returned to Japan and on March 20, 1930, he opened his first dojo in Tokyo. He named his dojo Shu Do Kan meaning "the hall for the study of the karate way." Toyama taught what he had learnt from Itosu and the Ch'uan Fa and did not claim to have originated a new style of karate. In 1946, Toyama founded the All Japan Karate-Do Federation (AJKF) with the intention of unifying the various forms of karate of Japan and Okinawa under one governing organization.

As Toyama did not view the Shu Do Kan as a distinct style of karate, but merely a place for training, he did not appoint a successor. Thus, the organization he founded fragmented after his death in 1966, although his student Toshi Hanaue maintained the original Shu Do Kan.
A few other schools based on Toyama's teachings still exist such as Doshinkan. Today, a minimal overseeing of the Toyama lineage of Karate is done by Kanken Toyama's son, Ha Toyama.

Overview
Shudokan learning is based on three factors: Katas, fighting alone and fighting in a group.

Kata
Shidokan employs following kata:
 Rohai
 Seiru
 Kyoku series: Shodan, Nidan, Sandan, Yondan, Godan, Rokudan, Shichidan
 Taikyoku series: Shodan, Nidan, Sandan
 Empi Iwa
 Empi Taki
 Penpei
 Penpo
 Shimpatan
 Shimpasho

Shudokan Today
Shudokan karate today is essentially a compound system, including Kobudo (i.e. "ancient art," referring to the specialized weapons practice of traditional Okinawan karate) and Shorin-Ryu (also known as Itosu-ha). Many other principles from other styles have found their way into Shudokan as it was Toyama's wish that Shudokan not stagnate, that it should grow in efficiency and flourish.

Influence on  Taekwondo via Korean students
Four of the nine schools (or Kwan's (Kan)) that merged to form Taekwondo have lineages that trace back to Toyama through three Korean men who trained in Japan while Korea was under Japanese occupation. These three men were Kim Ki Whang, Yun Kwae-byung, and Yoon Byung-In. Yun and Yoon both trained with Toyama and are both listed in his student role books as "Shihan."  

Both these men taught a mixture of Toyama's methods along with the Chuan Fa they learned in Manchuria, before the Taekwondo unification movement. At that time, they founded Tang Soo Do or Kong Soo Do schools in Korea.

The first Kwan (Kan) where they worked as teachers was the Yunmookwan (later: Jidokwan).  Kim Ki Whang received his 3rd dan from Toyama and had moved to the United States in the early 1960s to teach Taekwondo. Later, the Chang Moo Kwan, Han Moo Kwan, and Kang Duk Won branched off from the first Kwan. This is according to Han Moo Kwan founder Kyo Yoon Lee as written in his book Global Taekwondo 2009, and, A Modern History of Taekwondo, by Won Sik Kang and Kyong Myung Lee (1999).

Notable practitioners
 Kim Ki Whang
 Dr. Yun Kwae-Byung - founder of Jidokwan.
 Yoon Byung-In - founder of Chang Moo Kwan,
 Bong Soo Han - brought Hapkido to United States and founder of International Hapkido Federation.
 Walter Todd 
 Hanshi Morris Mack
Shihan Mike Franco (Jr.)

See also
 Tang Soo Do
 Kong Soo Do
 Kanbukan

References 

 Federacion Shudokan Internacional 
 Shudokan Martial Arts Association
 International Shudokan Karate Association
 History of Shudokan Karate
 American Shudokan Association Hombu dojo for the US
 Karatedo International Doshinkan
 Shudokan Mexico
 Shudokan Argentina

Japanese karate
Traditional karate
Japanese martial arts